A packaged terminal air conditioner (often abbreviated PTAC) is a type of self-contained heating and air conditioning system commonly found in hotels, motels, senior housing facilities, hospitals, condominiums, apartment buildings, add-on rooms & sunrooms. Many are designed to go through a wall, having vents and heat sinks both inside and outside. Different standard dimensions are found in the market including 42×16 inches (1067 x 406 mm), 36x15 inches, and 40x15 inches.

Although PTACs are used mostly to heat or cool a single living space using only electricity (with resistive and/or heat pump heating), there are cooling-only PTACs with external heating through a hydronic heating coil or natural gas heating. Typical PTAC heating and cooling capacity values range from 2 to 5.5 kilowatts (7,000–19,000 BTU/h) nominal. One characteristic of PTACs is that condensate drain piping is not required because the condensate water extracted from the air by the evaporator coil is drawn by the condenser fan onto the condenser coil surface where it evaporates. Conventional PTACs still require condensate drain piping to be installed. The first practical semi-portable air conditioning unit was invented by engineers at Chrysler Motors and offered for sale starting in 1935.

PTACs are commonly installed in window walls and masonry walls. Their installation typically requires the following:
 Louvers
 Metal sleeve
 Heating coil
 The PTAC itself
 Room enclosure

References

Cooling technology